New York City Serenade is a 2007 comedy-drama film written and directed by Frank Whaley and starring Freddie Prinze Jr., Chris Klein and Jamie-Lynn Sigler. It made its debut at the 2007 Toronto International Film Festival. The film takes its title from the Bruce Springsteen song of the same name from 1973.

Plot
Owen is an aspiring filmmaker who has been nominated for an award for one of his short films in which his friend Ray appears. Owen has a job developing photos in the film industry. Ray has an office job (this week) but still plays drums in a rock band, and he has a young daughter, Francie, as well as a drinking problem. Owen is engaged to Lynn.

Owen and Lynn go out to a film, where they meet Lynn's French literature professor Noam. Then they catch the end of one of the performances of Ray's band. Owen wants to continue the date with Lynn afterward, but Ray persuades Owen by asking for help moving his drums. Ray and Owen then wind up going to Bertrand's party where Owen and Rachel end up in bed.

Owen, Ray, and two of their friends are asked to serve as pallbearers when the father of their friend Matt dies in New Jersey. While Owen is out of town, Lynn and Rachel meet, and Lynn learns the truth about what Owen and Rachel did. Lynn wants to break up with Owen.

Owen takes Ray to the film festival where he hopes to win an award for his short film. When they arrive, their driver Les is supposed to take them to the airport motel, but Ray saw Wallace Shawn and found out he was staying at the Four Seasons. Ray and Owen go to the Four Seasons and Ray overhears that Shawn's son will be late, so Ray claims to be Shawn's son, and gets himself and Owen a nice room. At the festival, Owen does not win anything. After returning to the hotel, their scheme has been discovered and they are kicked out. Owen repeatedly calls Lynn trying to make up with her, but she never answers and the two are never again shown together. In Lynn's last scene, she is getting ready to go on a date with Noam.

At the end of the movie, some time has passed, Ray has straightened his life out, he has a good job, and he has a good relationship with his daughter. Owen has produced a successful television commercial.

Cast
Freddie Prinze Jr. as Owen
Chris Klein as Ray
Jamie-Lynn Sigler as Lynn
Ben Schwartz as Russ
Christopher DeBlasio as Ben
Sebastian Roché as Noam Broder
Wallace Shawn as himself
Frank Whaley as Les
Emma Bell as Melinda
Diana Gettinger as Rachel
Jeff Skowron as Matt

Reception
Kyle Smith of the New York Post called the film "one of those pointless indies that you'll have forgotten before the credits roll" and criticized Frank Whaley's "staggering lack of insight, imagination and wit". Nathan Lee of The New York Times called the film "transparently banal".

References

External links

2007 films
American comedy-drama films
Films directed by Frank Whaley
2000s English-language films
2000s American films